Umarell (Italian revisitation of the Bolognese Emilian word umarèl, plural umarî) are men of retirement age who spend their time watching construction sites, especially roadworksstereotypically with hands clasped behind their back and offering unwanted advice to the workers. Its literal meaning is "little man" (also ). The term is employed as lighthearted mockery or self-deprecation.

The modern term was popularised in 2005 by local writer Danilo Masotti through three books and an associated blog. In 2021, the word was included in the Zingarelli dictionary.

Instances of use
The town of San Lazzaro di Savena,  to the South-East of Bologna, awarded the "Umarell of the year" prize to a local resident, Franco Bonini.

In 2016, the local cultural association called  ("It only happens in Bologna") released the "Umarèl card" as a fundraiser for continued restoration of the San Petronio church. Separately, a smartphone app called Umarells was released that tracked the location of ongoing roadworks and construction sites. The fast food restaurant chain Burger King also "hired" several umarells as part of a social media marketing campaign promoting its increased presence in the country.

In July 2017, the Bologna city council's "consultative commission for the naming of street" approved the naming of a public square to the East of the city centre in the Cirenaica district  in recognition of the local fame of the concept and the name – noting with conscious irony that the square was under construction at the time.In April 2018 the public square was inaugurated by city councillor Matteo Lepore, the district president Simone Borsari, the "lord of the umarells" Franco Bonini, the stand-up comedian Maurizio Pagliari (Dulio Pizzocchi), and the writer Danilo Masotti. A year later the street-sign for the square was stolen. 

In April 2020, the comic magazine Topolino dedicated an episode to the umarell Gerindo Persichetti. In December 2020 in Pescara, the real estate developer Sarra installed windows to allow Umarells to observe three construction sites. Since 2019 an annual calendar has been sold in Bologna newsstands and in 2021 a board game La Giornata dell’Umarell (An Umarell's Day) was released.

See also 
 Armchair general
 Back-seat driver
 Dutch uncle
 Gongoozler
 Railfan
 Kibitzer
 Rubbernecking

References

Bibliography

Masotti, Danilo (2010). Umarells 2.0. Sono tanti, vivono in mezzo a noi, ci osservano... e noi osserviamo loro [Umarells 2.0. They are many, they live amongst us, they obvserve us... and we observe them]. Bologna, Pendragon Press. 
Masotti, Danilo (2016). Oltre il cantiere: fenomenologia degli Umarells [Beyond the construction site: the phenomenology of the Umarells]. Bologna, Pendragon Press. 
Masotti, Danilo (2021). Umarells per sempre/Forever [Umarells forever]. Bologna, Pendragon Press.

External links 
Umarell defined at Urban Dictionary
The Umarells blog

Culture in Bologna
Slang terms for men
Observation hobbies
Construction in Europe